Leadership training in the Boy Scouts of America includes training on how to administer the Scouting program, outdoor skills training for adults and youth, and leadership development courses for adults and youth. Some of these courses like Youth Protection Training are mandatory. Most of the courses are offered by the local council, while a few are hosted at the national level, currently at Philmont Training Center in New Mexico. They are available to members of all of the Boy Scout programs, including Cub Scouts, Boy Scouts, Explorer Posts, and Venturing Crews.

Adult leadership training

Depending on the adult volunteer's role, the Boy Scouts require all adults to attend a variety of training and leadership programs. Every adult leader must annually complete Youth Protection Training. Each adult must also complete a Fast Start training specific to their program. Position-specific training is provided, including unit committee members, Den Leaders, Cubmasters, Scoutmasters, Unit Commissioners, and others. Skill-specific training is also available to gain knowledge in outdoors skills including camping, hiking, first aid, Leave No Trace, swim safety, climbing safety, hazardous weather, and other skills.

The highest level of training available to Cub Scouting, Boy Scouting, and Venturing leaders is Wood Badge for the 21st Century.

In 2010, the National Council added new content about "Diversity/Inclusiveness", A "Communications Patrol," and content on "Generations." Participants who complete Wood Badge are eligible to attend a new national course at Philmont Training Center.  The Philmont Leadership Challenge mirrors the experience youth get at National Advanced Youth Leadership Experience.

High adventure training

The local council can offer high-adventure training to help prepare adults to conduct outdoor activities. Some councils use Powder Horn program to do this. Powder Horn is available to Venturing, Boy Scouting and Varsity Scouting leaders. Adult leaders of Boy Scouts of America's Sea Scouting program can take Seabadge, which is offered by four BSA Regions in two or three locations each year. Additional high-level adventure programs are available at Philmont Training Center.

Wood Badge recognition

All Wood Badge graduates have been recognized since the program's inception with a leather thong decorated with two beads. Individuals who take part on staff are eligible to wear three beads, while Course Directors are recognized with four beads. These beads were presented to the first Wood Badge participants by Baden-Powell, who obtained them while on a military campaign in Zululand, from a Zulu king named Dinizulu. Baden-Powell is said to have found the necklace when he came to Dinizulu's deserted mountain stronghold.

, the National Council decided that adults who staff other courses, including National Youth Leadership Training, National Advanced Youth Leadership Experience and Philmont Leadership Challenge, are all eligible to earn 3 and 4 beads based on specific criteria outlined in the NYLT Staff Guide.

Youth leadership training

Boys 10 to 18 are offered a variety of training programs. Boy Scout troop Scoutmasters are encouraged to offer Introduction to Leadership Skills for Troops, a unit level three-hour training session for all new boy leaders. The first program is designed to be run as-needed in a troop setting. The Scoutmaster and senior patrol leader will conduct this three-hour training whenever there are new Scouts or there has been a shift in leadership positions within the patrol or the troop. Venturing Crew members are offered a new course, Introduction to Leadership Skills for Crews.
 
The second course is a council-level, week-long National Youth Leadership Training (NYLT) usually held at a council camp. This course is an in-depth training program covering a variety of leadership ideas and skills. It is designed to simulate a month in the life of a Boy Scout unit. It uses fun and hands-on learning sessions to teach leadership skills. The Scouts learn about service-based leadership as they undertake a patrol quest for the meaning of leadership.

The third program, National Advanced Youth Leadership Experience (NAYLE), is offered to a limited number of youth at the Philmont Training Center. Six courses will be offered in 2019. The cost for the course in 2019 is $425. Transportation to and from Philmont is not included in the cost. Scouts are given an opportunity to expand their team building and ethical decision making skills learned in NYLT. NAYLE uses elements of Philmont Ranger training as well as advanced search-and-rescue skills to teach leadership, teamwork, and the lessons of selfless service. The NAYLE program is held in the Philmont wilderness where participants are taught leadership and teamwork using the elements of NYLT. It trains youth staff members from all regions to help lead council-level NYLT courses.

Venturing Crew members ages 14 through 21 of the Venturing program are encouraged to attend the Venturing Leadership Skills Course which is provided by the Venturing Crew or the local Boy Scout council. Crew officers can attend Crew Officer Orientation. and then a council-provided Kodiak leadership training program.

History of youth leadership programs

The National Youth Leadership Training (NYLT) program has its origins in leadership development programs developed by the Boy Scouts of America in the 1960s. Up to that point, junior leader training had been focused on Scoutcraft skills and the Patrol Method. Béla H. Bánáthy, Training Chairman of the Monterey Bay Area Council, California, founded the White Stag Leadership Development Program in 1958, and the National Boy Scout Council later adapted the leadership competencies he identified and developed into its junior leader training program. The national council's program has gone through a number of revisions since then, and the emphasis on and description of the leadership skills has evolved over the years.

NYLT is the most current incarnation of the  junior leader training program offered by the Boy Scouts of America. Its origins as a program that teaches leadership skills originated on the Presidio of Monterey at the Army Language School in  California. Until the early 1960s, junior leader training focused primarily on Scoutcraft skills and teaching the Patrol Method. Béla H. Bánáthy, a veteran of World War II and a Hungarian refugee, had been national director for youth leadership development for the Hungarian Boy Scout Association. In 1958 he was Training Chairman of the Monterey Bay Area Council and a Hungarian language instructor at the Army Language School on the Monterey Peninsula. That summer he organized an experimental patrol to teach boys leadership skills at the Monterey Bay Area Council's Pico Blanco Scout Reservation. A group of volunteer Scouters formally christened it as the White Stag program in 1959, and through the early 1960s it gradually evolved into a three-phase, multi-year program. The Presidio commanding officer saw value in the program early on and provided a building on the post for the Scouts' use.

Béla Bánáthy was personal friends with Bob Perin, Assistant National Director of the Volunteer Training Service for the Boy Scouts of America. Perin provided guidance and acted as a liaison to the National Council.  Two members of the Monterey Bay Area Council also had connections with the National Council: Fran Peterson of Chular, California, was a member of the BSA's National Engineering Service, and F. Maurice Tripp of Saratoga, California, was a research scientist and member of the National Boy Scout Training Committee. They encouraged the national staff to look at the White Stag program. In January 1964, Boy Scout executives and board members from the National Council and the Monterey Bay Area Council's executive staff and some of its board members attended a meeting at Asilomar in Pacific Grove, California. Organized by Tripp, the purpose of the meeting was to acquaint the national council leadership with the new design for junior leader training and to evaluate whether the ideas could be effectively incorporated into teaching leadership skills within Scouting.

The meeting was notable for the people it drew from across the United States. The positions of the individuals from the headquarters of the Boy Scouts of America in New Jersey included top national BSA executives and board members. From the National Council, attendees from the professional staff were Marshall Monroe (Assistant National Scout Executive), Bill Lawrence (National Director of Volunteer Training), Bob Perin (Assistant National Director of the Volunteer Training Service), Ken Wells (Director of Research Service), Jack Rhey (National Director of Professional Training),  and Walt Whidden (Region 12 Executive). Also present were two volunteers: National Council President Ellsworth Augustus, and  National Council Vice President Herold C. Hunt, a Professor of Education at Harvard.

The local attendees also represented the top council leadership. Representatives from the Monterey Bay Area Council were Tom Moore (Monterey Bay Area Council Executive), Dale Hirt (President of the Monterey Bay Area Council), Béla Bánáthy (Council Training Chairman, Director of White Stag, and Director of the East Europe and Middle East Division of the Army Language School), Paul Hood (Research Scientist at U.S. Army's Human Resources Research Office), John Barr (Chairman of the Department of Education at San Jose State University), Joe St. Clair (Chairman, Hungarian Department at the Army Language School on the Presidio and Training Committee Chairman), Fran Peterson (member of the White Stag Advisory Board, Scoutmaster in Chular, California, and member of the National Council's Engineering Service), F. Maurice Tripp (Chairman, White Stag Advisory Committee), Ralph Herring (member of the White Stag Advisory Committee), Ferris Bagley (a retired businessman with an interest in leadership development), and Judson Stull (a White Stag Committee member and local attorney).

National Council approves study

The National Council was, according to Dr. John W. Larson, former Director of Boy Scout Leader Training for the National Council, "snowed by Bánáthy's language. They didn't get what he was talking about." But one national board member did. Herold Hunt, a Professor of Education at Harvard, prevailed on the board to take a longer look. The BSA Research Service was tasked with conducting the necessary research. Larson, at the time a staff researcher for the National Council, traveled to California and observed the program's annual Indaba at the Presidio of Monterey later that year. Larson and Bob Perin traveled from New Jersey to California repeatedly. They conducted a thorough study, interviewing participants, parents, and leaders. They distributed questionnaires to program participants, reviewed the White Stag literature, and observed the program in action. They also conducted a statistical analysis of troops taking part in White Stag and compared them to non-participating units. In December 1965, Chief Scout Executive Joseph Brunton received the White Stag Report. It stated that offering leadership development to youth was a unique opportunity for Scouting to provide a practical benefit to youth and would add substantial support to Scouting's character development goals. It recommended that Wood Badge should be used to implement  the leadership development principles of White Stag.

There were a few on the National Staff who strongly resisted the change to how leaders and youth were trained, including "Green Bar Bill" Hillcourt, who was loyal to the idea of teaching purely Scoutcraft skills and the Patrol Method at Wood Badge. While immensely respected for his many contributions to Scouting, Chief Scout Joseph Brunton overruled Hillcourt's objections and approved adapting the White Stag leadership competencies for nationwide use. Over the next several years, Larson repeatedly visited the Monterey Peninsula to observe and evaluate the White Stag program. He worked with Perin and Bánáthy to adapt the White Stag leadership competencies. Larson wrote the first syllabus for the adult Wood Badge program. Shifting from teaching primarily Scoutcraft skills to leadership competencies was a paradigm shift, changing the assumptions, concepts, practices, and values underlying how adults were trained in the skills of Scouting. The change paralleled a similar change in the point of view about how individuals learned leadership skills in society at large from that of trait theory based on inborn skills to transactional theory which stipulated that leadership skills could be acquired.

World Scouting publishes paper 

The World Organization of the Scout Movement published the results of the Boy Scouts of America's research and testing of the White Stag approach to leadership development. Béla Bánáthy wrote a monograph Leadership Development: World Scouting Reference Paper No. 1, which he presented in 1969 to a meeting of the World Scout Conference in Helsinki, Finland. He advocated leadership development by design in Scouting based on the leadership competencies of White Stag.

In 1968, Salvador Fernández Beltrán, Deputy Secretary of the World Organization of the Scout Movement, visited camp during the summer program at Pico Blanco Scout Reservation. Leaders of the Mexican Scout movement asked Bánáthy to guide them in the adaptation of the White Stag program concept. Bánáthy was appointed to the Interamerican Scout Committee and participated in three Interamerican Train the Trainer events in Mexico, Costa Rica, and Venezuela. He guided their national training teams in designing leadership development by design programs.

Junior leadership training mandated nationwide

In 1974, the changes in Wood Badge were migrated to a new junior leader training program which was implemented nationwide. Junior leader training programs had until that time focused primarily on Scoutcraft skills and teaching the Patrol Method. The new program marked the organization's shift from emphasizing Scoutcraft skills in training to teaching leadership skills and gave credit to White Stag for its origins.  The Troop Leader Development program incorporated for the first time eleven specific competencies of leadership. The eleven competencies were adapted from the White Stag Leadership Development Program. According to the Boy Scout publication:

The junior leader training program incorporated for the first time eleven specific competencies of leadership. Prior junior leader training programs had focused primarily on Scoutcraft skills and the Patrol Method. The national JLT program extracted the leadership competencies from the White Stag program but did not adopt any of the other White Stag methods, including the spirit and traditions associated with the white stag of Hungarian mythology. The national program also changed some of the terminology used to refer to the leadership competencies and identified the competencies as "Leadership Skills"

The program was later revised and renamed Troop Leader Training Conference and then Junior Leader Training Conference.

Back to basics program introduced

The Boy Scouts radically revised their handbook in 1972. The new handbook made learning outdoor skills optional for the three lower ranks and completely eliminated outdoor merit badges, including Camping, Cooking, Nature, Swimming, Lifesaving, from the required list for the higher three ranks. Under the new program, a Scout could reach First Class without hiking, camping or cooking over a fire. It was a disastrous failure for Scouting and membership plummeted.

William Hillcourt came out of retirement and donated a year of his life to write the 9th Edition of the Scout Handbook. It returned to the traditional Scouting program and had a great deal in common with Hillcourt's earlier Handbooks (6th & 7th Editions). It included entire paragraphs and pictures reprinted verbatim from the earlier editions.

Brownsea II focuses on Scoutcraft

In 1976, the Boy Scouts introduced Brownsea II (Brownsea Double Two) to supplement Troop Leadership Development. It was developed in reaction to the changes to Scouting, including the advancement rules that no longer required Scouts to take a hike before obtaining the first class rank. The week-long course, unlike the Troop Leadership Program, was a "back-to-basics" program for Senior Patrol Leaders that was "program- and action-oriented." It emphasized teaching and practicing Scout skills, the purposes of Scouting, and the role of the patrol method within the troop program. Its goals were to develop leadership by giving Scouts opportunities to lead games that they could take back to the home troop, and by exposing the Scout to a leadership development project called "The Brownsea Pioneering Project".

Modifications implemented
In 1979, the next iteration of junior leader training was introduced in the Troop Leader Training Conference. It was published "to eventually replace Troop Leader Development (#6544) and also provide the Scoutcraft skills experiences of Brownsea Double Two." This paralleled a roll-back of an urban emphasis in Scouting which had removed mention of the word "campfire" from the 8th edition of the Boy Scout Handbook. Effective Teaching, formerly named Manager of Learning, was renamed to sound less academic.

While the stated aim was to consolidate the two programs, many councils continued to produce both programs or used elements from the previous programs. This resulted in growing inconsistency in how junior leader training was delivered nationwide. In 1989 Pine Tree Camp, the Junior Leader Training Conference of the former Viking Council in Minneapolis, Minnesota was the proving grounds for a redesign of the Junior Leader Training Conference, a week-long leadership development program sponsored by local Councils for the top youth leaders of Scout troops.

In 1993, the Boy Scouts of America adapted the Pine Tree program's syllabus for national use.  A team of volunteers  revised the Junior Leader Training Conference, expanded each of the Scoutcraft activities to include learning objectives, added details of the games and contests, a list of materials and summary information. The national council also rewrote the leadership competencies Setting the Example, and to a lesser extent, Controlling the Group. A new concept called reflection was introduced. These sections of the syllabus suggested questions to assist the youth staff with drawing out from participants what they got out of a learning activity, to reinforce what they learned, and to help with evaluation at the end of each learning session.

The syllabus was revised once again in 1995 and renamed Junior Leader Training Conference Staff Guide. It presented modified versions of the eleven leadership competencies conceived of by Béla Bánáthy and still being presented by the White Stag program.

Program updated for nationwide use

After the Wood Badge program was updated in 2003, parallel changes were subsequently implemented that affected junior leader training. A junior leadership training Task Force was assembled during 2003-04 and undertook revisions to that program to bring it closer in alignment to the Wood Badge program. In 2003, the Boy Scouts pilot-tested a revised NYLT course in the Sam Houston Area Council under the name "Grey Wolf". Additional pilot courses were held in several BSA regions during 2004 and 2005. In 2005, they published the National Youth Leadership Training syllabus. Based on feedback from the youth themselves, the course was renamed using Youth in the title rather than Junior. The teens said they preferred the term "youth" over "junior", because "junior" gave the impression that the teens were not yet a leader where "youth' just described their age.

After successful regional pilot courses, NYLT was mandated for use in place of all other junior leadership development programs in the nation. This  created a standard of training that would be consistent around the country. The consistency is achieved by providing many of the programmatic resources required by the program such as a DVD with some prepared presentations and videos.

The content contained in the Boy Scouts of America youth leadership training program has evolved as the business world's model of leadership theory have evolved. In the 1960s, concepts of participatory leadership were evolving from trait-based leadership to transaction-based models. The former included Rensis Likert's System 4 leadership model and the latter Blake and Moulton's Managerial grid model. The Boy Scout's junior leader training program similarly evolved, adapting comparable principles from the White Stag program in the late 1960s.

Since then, the program has evolved to keep pace with changes to the adult Wood Badge program, which now emphasizes the stages of team development based on the principles described by Bruce Tuckman in 1965 as forming-storming-norming-performing.

Standardization
Recent revisions have emphasized that NYLT is a national program and strongly discouraged variation from the minute-by-minute agenda. Local councils are instructed to be sure that their courses comply with the NYLT syllabus.  Councils were permitted for several years to add a local, traditional name like "Pine Tree", "Silver Bear", or "Golden Acorn" to the NYLT course name, a practice which many councils had engaged in for a number of years. In 2009, the National council modified this stance and forbid councils to use any name but NYLT for the program. Not all councils adhere to this requirement. The Northern Star Council still calls their program "Grey Wolf", the Mecklenburg County Council still calls their course "Top Gun National Youth Leadership Training", and the San Francisco Bay Area Council still informally refers to their program as "Brownsea NYLT". In 2014, the national program again permitted local traditions and names in addition to NYLT.

Experimental course
NYLT Leadership Academy is a course conducted on a national level that trains youth staff members for council-level NYLT courses.  NYLT Leadership Academy is currently offered at Camp William B. Snyder in Haymarket, Virginia, with two courses being offered each summer. It is also offered for one week each in St. Louis, Missouri and San Francisco, California.

Notes

References

Boy Scouts of America